South Wilson is a hamlet in the town of Wilson in Niagara County, New York, United States.

References

Hamlets in New York (state)
Hamlets in Niagara County, New York